Believe may refer to: 

Belief, a psychological state in which an individual holds a proposition or premise to be true, with or without proof for such proposition
Faith, a belief in something which has not been proven

Arts, entertainment, and media

Films
 Believe, a 2000 horror film starring Ben Gazzara
 Believe, a 2000 short film starring James Roday
 Believe (2007 film), a mockumentary film starring Larry Bagby
 Believe (2013 film), a sports drama film starring Brian Cox
 Believe (2016 film), a Christmas drama film starring Ryan O'Quinn
 Believe: The Eddie Izzard Story, a 2009 documentary about Eddie Izzard
 Justin Bieber's Believe, a 2013 concert film starring Justin Bieber

Music

Albums
 Believe (33Miles album), 2009
 Believe (Celtic Woman album), 2011
 Believe (Cher album), or the title song (see below), 1998
 Believe (Dima Bilan album), or the title song (see below), 2009
 Believe (Disturbed album), or the title song, 2002
 Believe (Emerson Drive album), or the title song, 2009
 Believe (Girlschool album), 2004
 Believe (Jai McDowall album), 2011
 Believe (The Jets album), 1989
 Believe (Justin Bieber album), or the title song, 2012
 Believe (Katherine Jenkins album), 2009
 Believe (Th' Legendary Shack Shakers album), 2004
 Believe (Morgan Page album), or the title song, 2010
 Believe (Natalie Grant album), 2005
 Believe (Orianthi album), or the title song, originally by Niels Brinck (see below), 2009
 Believe (Savatage album), or the title song (see below), 1998
 Believe (Yolanda Adams album), 2001
 Believe (Sugarboy album), 2017
 Believe, by Big Dismal, 2003
 Believe, by Carlo Resoort (recording as 4 Strings), 2002
 Believe, by Eunice Olsen, 2004
 Believe, by George Nozuka, 2007
 Believe, by Harem Scarem, Japanese title for Karma Cleansing, 1997
 Believe, by Katie Armiger, 2008
 Believe, by Laurent Véronnez, 2002
 Believe, by Ross Copperman, 2003

EPs
 Believe (EP), by Versailles, 2005
 Believe, an EP by Indecision

Songs
 "Believe" (The Bravery song), 2007
 "Believe" (Brooks & Dunn song), 2005
 "Believe" (The Chemical Brothers song), 2005
 "Believe" (Cher song), 1998
 "Believe" (Crystal Waters song), 2016
 "Believe" (Dima Bilan song), winner of the Eurovision Song Contest 2008
 "Believe" (Elton John song), 1994
 "Believe" (Goldie song), 1998
 "Believe" (Josh Groban song), from the film The Polar Express, 2004
 "Believe" (Kalafina song), 2014
 "Believe" (Lenny Kravitz song), 1993
 "Believe" (Luna Sea song), 1993
 "Believe" (Meek Mill song), 2020
 "Believe" (Misia song), 1999
 "Believe" (Mumford & Sons song), 2015
 "Believe" (Nami Tamaki song), 2003
 "Believe" (Staind song), 2008
 "Believe" (Suzie McNeil song), 2007, from Broken & Beautiful
 "Believe / Kumorinochi, Kaisei", a single by Arashi, 2009
 "Believe Again" (Niels Brinck song), covered as "Believe" by Orianthi, 2009
 "Believe", by Ai from What's Goin' On Ai
 "Believe", by Aiden from Conviction
 "Believe", by Alexandra Burke from The Truth Is
 "Believe", by The All-American Rejects from When the World Comes Down
 "Believe", by All Things New from The Good News
 "Believe", by Amen Dunes from Freedom
 "Believe", by Antiloop
 "Believe", by Asking Alexandria from From Death to Destiny
 "Believe", by Beartooth from Disease
 "Believe", by Big K.R.I.T. from K.R.I.T. Iz Here
 "Believe", by Blue October UK from Incoming
 "Believe", by Branden Steineckert, club anthem for Real Salt Lake of Major League Soccer
 "Believe", by Breaking Benjamin from We Are Not Alone
 "Believe", by Carola Häggkvist
 "Believe", by Coldrain from 8AM
 "Believe", by DB Boulevard
 "Believe", by Devin Townsend from Epiclouder demos
 "Believe", by Dig
 "Believe", by Eminem from Revival
 "Believe", by Flickerstick from Causing a Catastrophe
 "Believe", by Folder 5
 "Believe", by Hollywood Undead from Notes from the Underground
 "Believe", by Ian Van Dahl from Lost & Found
 "Believe", by Julian Lennon from Photograph Smile
 "Believe", by K's Choice from Cocoon Crash
 "Believe", by Miliyah Kato
 "Believe", by Nidji from Breakthru'
 "Believe", by Nightmare from Ultimate Circus
 "Believe", by Psycho Motel from Welcome to the World
 "Believe", by Riot from Immortal Soul
 "Believe", by Savatage from Streets: A Rock Opera
 "Believe", by Shawn Mendes from the soundtrack to Descendants
 "Believe", by Skillet Awake
 "Believe", by Since October from Life, Scars, Apologies
 "Believe", by The Smashing Pumpkins from Judas O
 "Believe", by Take That from III
 "Believe", by Travis Garland
 "Believe", by Uriah Heep from Into the Wild
 "Be(lie)ve", by While She Sleeps from This Is the Six
 "Believe", by Yellowcard from Ocean Avenue
 "Believe", from The Scarlet Pimpernel
 "Believe (Waiting for an Answer)", by The Afters from Life is Beautiful

Tours
 Believe Tour, by Justin Bieber
 Do You Believe? (tour), by Cher, also known as Believe Tour

Shows
 "Believe", a Shamu show at three SeaWorld parks
 Believe... There's Magic in the Stars, a fireworks display at Disneyland
 Criss Angel Believe, a Cirque du Soleil show in Las Vegas

Other uses in arts, entertainment, and media
 Believe (TV series), a 2014 science fantasy series
 "Believe", a marketing campaign for the video game Halo 3
 "Believe", an episode of The Good Doctor

Other uses
 Believe (fragrance), a fragrance by Britney Spears

See also

 Belief (disambiguation)
 Believer (disambiguation)
 I Believe (disambiguation)
 
 Faith (disambiguation)